Neuwiller-lès-Saverne (literally Neuwiller near Saverne;) is a commune in the Bas-Rhin department in Grand Est in north-eastern France.

Landmarks
The handsome 1873 synagogue survived the war.

See also
 Communes of the Bas-Rhin department

References

Communes of Bas-Rhin
Bas-Rhin communes articles needing translation from French Wikipedia